Ali Zare Ghanatnowi is an Iranian film director, screenwriter, translator, cinema teacher, graphic designer, cameraman, and film producer. An active film-maker from 2000, he had been involved in over twenty films, including animations, shorts, and documentaries. Zare attained critical acclaim for directing Empty View (2017) and Dad's Fragile Doll (2013) which was awarded the best animation of International Open Film Festival (IOFF). His other film Empty View has won multiple international awards, including the best animation of Asians On Film (first award and the best film music).  The music part in Empty View is made by Mohammadreza Aligholi. Empty view has been in the official selections for the best animation in Edmonton International Film Festival in Canada. This festival is among those confirmed by Oscar Academy that is held every year in Edmonton, Alberta. Ali Zare Ghanat Nowi who had achieved this before, by Dad's Fragile Doll being selected in Anima Mundi (event), now again reached this place by Empty View.

His Empty View book was translated and published in France in 2021.

Early life and background 
Zare was born in Shiraz in 1981. His first experience as a very young teenager was at Iran National Broadcasting in Fars Province channel in 1997. He continued it into his late teens because of his early interest in cinema and theater beginning from high school. So, before leaving home to study at University of Tehran and then Berlin School, he had some experience with cinema and film-making that supported his studies.

As a director and cameraman, he worked in making some TV commercials and advertising from 2006 to 2016. Around 2004 to 2013, in Shiraz film club, had been active in holding film and criticism meetings. Most of these meetings were hold in Shiraz University and Hafez hall about famous movies by great directors. In 2004 he founded Cinema School in Shiraz
. As a manager and teacher in Cinema School, he made many workshops about cinema, criticism, editing, screenwriting, make-up etc. Beside himself teaching, he invited many important people like Saeed Aghighi, Farzad Motamen, Mohammadreza Aslani, Mahmoud Kalari, Mehri Shirazi, Homayoun As'adian, Zhila Mehrjooii, Mohammad Aalaadpoosh, Jamal Mirsadeghi, Rahim Hoodi etc.

Film career 
In 1999 Zare worked in a TV project named Didgah (View) as the editor, assistant director, and writer. It was a program which was broadcast in Fars Province channel and had discussions about the films by some critiques following the film being displayed. They were the latest important foreign movies with Persian subtitles. Meanwhile, Zare was also the writer of Iran, Sale Sefr, (Iran, the year zero) a radio play about Iran in one hundred years later. An author who has been abroad for many years, comes back to Iran and faces new conditions and different situations.

In 2000, Zare pursued his ambition to be a director by making HandiCrafts in Fars Province. It was a 13-part TV documentary about local people making handicrafts. It used folklore music while showing their handicrafts. Following this, Zare wrote and directed his first short film Paeeze Khakestari (2000) meaning Gray Autumn. It tells the story of a man who has been lost for four years and has lost his memory. Now he faces some familiar surroundings, until the reason of his lost and losing his memory is discovered. In the same year, Zare helped in directing and editing Mosabegheh Delavar Mardane Fat'h, (Gallant Guys Conquer) a 52-part TV match with military members participating to gain more score and win.

In 2001, Zare was busy as the editor of Jahan Nama (World View). It was a 52-part documentary about fantastic places worldwide with a different editing method which he himself did the sounding too. That year he also released his second short film. Barandegan Chizi Nemibarand (Winners Win Nothing), written and directed by him, and it has a story about a soldier who has come back from the war as a shell-shocked ill man. He is still in the mindset of war then some filmmakers find him. Zare edited a short film called Vahe (2003) meaning Oasis. In 2004, he wrote and directed MIT, an industrial documentary that revolved around introducing an educational package called MIT in a university.

In 2006 Zare directed and wrote a video art: Makoo. The story is about three women in different times and different social classes that each woman seems to continue the life process of the previous. In 2008, he directed a documentary named Chahar Marge Yek Nevisandeh (Four Deaths of a Writer). It is the life of a writer showing how he dies four times in his works and the screenplay was written with the help of Shahriar Mandanipour. It was not until his release of Red Mind (2009) that he began to gain recognition out of Shiraz. Red Mind documentary which was produced, directed, and wrote all by himself, is based on Shahab al-Din Yahya ibn Habash Suhrawardi notes. The film tells the story of creating human, the eternal love between human and God, human descent, and love reincarnation in human.

Faryadha o Najvaha (2010) meaning Whispers and Cries is described as a narration of the life within blind and deaf kids in special schools. It shows sadly the hard life of those kids. This documentary also relates to the teachers who make endless efforts and have unconditional passion for helping the disabled kids. Zare uses khaki colored themes in Safarnameh Sistan which was made in 2011. This documentary is about a trip to Sistan and meeting Balochi ethnics. It illustrates the very hard life of people living there, giving information about their life style in such a dry area. This documentary is a free adaptation from Meet the Baloch People by Mahmoud Dowlatabadi. In 2012 Zare was involved in the screenwriting of The Lights, which he also produced and directed. It's about the famous writer Jamal Mirsadeghi, his life and writings. In 2013, he released Dad's Fragile Doll, Zare's first animation, which narrates the story of a political prisoner who has a kid. The family gets upset with arresting the father but the girl dreams about killing the man who arrested him. The animation examines rotoscoping technique which was the first time done in Iran. The screenplay was adopted from a story by Houshang Golshiri with the same title. It won the best animation of veteran's festival in Australia. Dad's Fragile Doll received praise from people such as Ted Hope, the famous producer of 21 grams and was displayed in cinemas across Germany and US.

In 2014 Zare wrote The lives of Others for his former student, Bahareh Ahmadi. This film is regarded as a narration about a girl who loses her hopes to continue life. The animation follows the two dimension technique as designed by hand. Meanwhile, these, he edited Shahre man, Aabaadi (My City, the Dorp), a TV film. In 2015 Zare was selected in Ozark Foothills Film Fest in US for his directing of the film Bande Naaf (Umbilical Cord). This movie is about a woman who tells the story of her baby. The style of film-making for that is experimental. Some flashbacks are used to show the feelings and lunatic thoughts of a mother about her missed baby. Timology from 2015, was edited and produced by him. This experimental movies talks about the contemporary life of human who has been lost in time and existence. That year he also edited and produced Jump In Love for his two former students Ali Lavari and Vahid Mobasheri.

Zare next wrote the screenplay and directed Hafteye Ayandeh (2015) meaning Next Week, a documentary about a week of effort that disabled kids do to have a normal life. Between 2015 and 2017, he was involved in the production, directing, and editing of Zand Street, The Kiss, Internationale, Pour with the rain (about Amin Faghiri), and Empty View, all of them finished. Zand Street and Pour with the Rain are documentaries and the other three are animations. His last work is an animation named Essence which is selected in CineGlobe Switzerland Festival. Inspired by a tone poem, named Also sprach Zarathustra (Strauss) by Richard Strauss, the film reckons that every human is a vast galaxy.

Zare was honored three years (2010, 2011 and 2012) to receive the Management Excellence award for managing Madreseh Kargahiye Cinema (Cinema School). It was the honor given from the Culture minister to the best manager every year.

Film festival work
Zare was a jury member at some film festivals, most notably the Berlin International Film Festival in 2016. The same year, Zare judged the films in Cinema Perpetuum Mobile festival in Belarus. He has the judge experience in the International Open Film Festival (IOFF) in 2015, Kal Film Festival (2014) in Gerash County, Fars Province, Iran, in addition to Shiraz film festival (2013).

Reception and criticism
Zare has received acclaim for Dad's Fragile Doll from Ted Hope, the producer of 21 Grams; He said: "Dad’s Fragile Doll’s hand drawn intimacy and well told story caught a horrific moment and made it accessible to all while also adding new depth to the subject matter." The animation won $70,000  prize in Viewster Online Film Festival. In Berkeh Film Festival, it was told to be "a formative view and intelligent adaptation from Persian literature."

He has succeeded to display his films in more than 150 countries. About Dad's Fragile Doll it's been said: "intelligently addresses not only children but especially adults, through the eyes of a child, and in an "innocent" but biting manner of the days of terror Of a dictatorship and the effects on a family." This animation was also described as: "intense and dramatic … intensifying the censorship of intellectuals throughout the country." It has received more than 20 professional critics in Hong Kong newspapers. Zare was called the most worldwide-honored Iranian director in 2014.

He recently was appreciated for Empty View which was described as "a testament to the unique power of animation to bring life to the artificial. With enough care and talent poured into every second, a film created entirely by hand can feel as real, if not more so, than reality captured on a camera."

Books
In 2008 Ali Zare GhanatNowi translated the screenplay of The Grapes of Wrath by Nunnally Johnson which is an adaptation of the same novel by John Steinbeck. The film was made by John Ford. The final edition for the Persian translation was done by Saeed Aghighi. In 2005 Zare translated the screenplay 21 Grams by Guillermo Arriaga.

He has two books in press: Digital Photography Darkroom and Keywords in Cinema. He also has done the cover designing of World of Colors and Two lit up blue lights both by Jamal Mirsadeghi. Zare has published some cinema critics and film reviews in some newspapers too.

Honors and awards

Awards
Zare has won some awards up to 2018 as follows:

Empty View

2018- Best Director Award of SOUTHAMPTON INTERNATIONAL FILM FESTIVAL, UK, Hampshire

2018- BEST SHORT FEST, Canada, Ontario

2018- Great Message International Film Festival, India, Pune

2018- Indie Best Films Festival, USA, Santa Mónica 

2018- Mexico International Film Festival, Mexico 

2018- The Seoul Guro International Kids Film Festival, South Korea, Seoul

2018- ATHENS ANIMFEST, Greece, Athens

2018- Amsterdam film festival and Van-Gogh Award, Netherlands, Amsterdam

2017- 1st Chania Cartoon & Animation Festival (Jury Award), Greece,

2017- The first prize in UK monthly film festival, England

2017- Los Angeles Film Awards

2017- Asians On Film, USA, Los Angeles

Dad's Fragile Doll

2018- The Mosaic Film Festival, USA

2017- London X4 international festival, England

2016- Berkeh Film Festival, Lamerd, Fars, Iran

2016- The Best Animation of International Open Film Festival (IOFF), Dhaka, Bangladesh

2016- The Best Animation of The Kids Festival, Madrid, Spain

2015- The best animation Cinema Perpetuum Mobile International Short Film Festival, Minsk, Belarus

2015- The Best Animation of VETERANS FILM FESTIVAL, Canberra, Australian

2014- Diploma ANIMAMUNDI INTERNATIONAL ANIMATION FESTIVAL, Sao Paula, Brazil

2014- Diploma ANIMA-SAO INTERNATIONAL ANIMATION FESTIVAL, Rio de Janeiro, Brazil

2014- Diploma of Seoul International Cartoon and Animation Festival, Seoul, South Korea

2014- The best animation of Parvin Etesami film festival, Tehran, Iran

2014- The Best film of Viewster international festival, Zurich, Switzerland

2014- Winner of the Grand Medal, Shiraz Short Film 2014, Iran

2014- Winner of the perspective of the audience in Viewster international festival, Zurich, Switzerland

Sistan Itinerary

2011- Best film at Naser Khosro Festival, Tehran, Iran

HandiCrafts in Fars Province

2000- The best TV documentary at Iran Radio and TV Festival, Tehran, Iran

Red Mind

2009- The best film at Shiraz Festival, Iran

Oasis

2004- The best Editing at Shiraz MY City festival, Iran

Nominees
His works has been also nominees in some festivals as follow:

Empty View

2017- Los Angeles Independent Film Festival, USA

2017- Los Angeles Cine fest, USA

2017- Feel the Reel festival, England

2017- Sunfilm festival, Tokyo, Japan

2017- Eurasia International Film Festival, Russia

Dad's Fragile Doll

2017- Burien film festival, Washington, USA

2016- Lima bean film fest, St Louise, USA

2015- Internacional Cine al Mar, Bogota, Colombia

2015- Mecal, 17th Festival International of Short Film and Animation of Barcelona, Spain

2014- 7th Festival de Curtas Metragens – Entretodos, Mexico City, Mexico.

2014- 16th FESTCURTASBH Belo Horizonte International Short Film Festival, Brazil

2014- 20th IFVA International Film Festival, Hong Kong, China

2014- 26th Film Festival in Girona, Spain

2014- 30th Mar del Plata International Film Festival, Argentina

2014- Animpact Animation Festival, Seoul, South Korea

2014- Erie international filmfest, Pennsylvanian, USA

2014- International Animation Festival Athens ANIMFEST, Greece

2014- International Fantastic & Horror Award HEMOGLOZINE, Ciudad Real, Spain

2014- Buenos Aires International Festival of Independent Cinema, Argentina

2014- International Film Festival Cine Curtas Bodega Cultural, Florianopolis, Brazil

2014- International film Festival IVAHM'14 Madrid, Spain

2014- Kaohsiung Film Festival, Taipei, Taiwan

2014- Khaneh Cinema Celebration (House of Cinema), Tehran, Iran

2014- Naoussa International Film Festival, Greece

2014- The Best Film for Adults at the Festival TOFUZI, Batumi, Georgia

Red Mind

2009- CINEMA VERITE International Documentary Film Festival, Tehran, Iran

2009- Khaneh Cinema Celebration (House of Cinema), Tehran, Iran

Sistan Itinerary

2011- Cinema Verite (The Annual Iran International Documentary Film Festival), Tehran, Iran

The Lights

2011- CINEMA VERITE International Documentary Film Festival, Tehran, Iran

Internationale

2017- CURTASTIK international film festival, Barcelona, Spain

2017- CINETORO film festival, Bolivia

Essence

2017- CURTASTIK film festival, Barcelona, Spain

Official selections
And just a part of his official selection are as follow:

Empty View

2017- Asia Rainbow Film Festival, Beijing, China

2017- Digital Griffix Film Festival, Canada

Coming Week

2017- Harrogate Film Festival, England

2016- FIA Festival Internacional Audiovisual, Chia, Colombia

2016- SABC Ekurhuleni International Film Festival, South Africa

Dad's Fragile Doll

2016- Animation Day in Cannes, France

2017- Open World Animation Festival, Pennsylvania, USA

2017- The millennial film festival 2017 nominated (best animation and best short film), Texas, USA

2017- Los Angeles Cinefest, USA

2014- International Animation Festival “Golden Kuker-Sofia” Bulgaria

2014- Animation competition at Kinofest, Bucharest, Romania

The Lives Of Others

2017- The Back Alley Artists Night, Vancouver, Canada

2015- Blackbird Film Fest, New York, USA

2016- 29 Girona Film Festival, Spain

2015- OISFF International Film, Seoul, South Korea

2015- International Film Visionario, Udine, Italy

Umbilical Cord

2016- Goldensun Short Film Festival, Zebbug, Malta

2015- Experimental Superstars Film Festival, Novi Sad, Serbia

2015- Ozark Shorts, LA, USA

Jump In Love

2016- Lima Bean Film Fest, St Louise, USA

2016- Comicpalooza Film Festival, Houston, USA

References

External links/references
 Ali Zare Ghanat Nowi at hyperleap
 Veterans Film Festival, 2015
 Ali Zare Ghanat Nowi's Biography
 Ali Zare Ghanat Nowi, Google Scholar
 Ali Zare Ghanat Nowi's biography at IMDb

1981 births
Living people
Iranian film directors
Iranian photographers
Iranian screenwriters
Iranian film producers
Iranian graphic designers
Iranian writers